Apeiranthos or Aperathos ( or ; local dialect:) is a mountainous village on the island of Naxos in Greece. The similarities of the local dialect and traditions to those of mountainous Cretan villages has led some historians to the conclusion that Apeiranthos was built by Cretans during the 10th century. The first historical evidence regarding the existence of the village goes back to 1420, on a reference by the Italian traveler Cristoforo Buondelmonti on his book Liber insularum archipelagi (The Book of the Islands of the Archipelago).

The village has four museums: the Archaeological Museum of Apeiranthos, the Museum of Folk Art, the Geological Museum, and the Museum of Natural History. With a population of 722 (2011 census), the village is the second largest on the island after Filoti.

Notable people 
Manolis Glezos (1922-2020), politician and writer
Petros Protopapadakis (1854–1922), Prime Minister of Greece
Michalis Vardanis (1936–2014), Army officer

Natural History Museum

Naxos
Populated places in Naxos (regional unit)